Rolando Domingo Abreu Canela (born 15 May 1992) is a Cuban football player. He plays for Santiago de Cuba.

International
He made his Cuba national football team debut on 22 March 2018 in a friendly against Nicaragua, as a starter.

He was included in his country's 2019 CONCACAF Gold Cup squad.

References

External links
 
 

Living people
1992 births
Cuban footballers
Cuba international footballers
Association football midfielders
FC Santiago de Cuba players
2019 CONCACAF Gold Cup players
Sportspeople from Santiago de Cuba
21st-century Cuban people